The 1954 Campeonato Argentino de Rugby was won by the selection of Buenos Aires Province ("Provincia") that beat in the final la Ciudad Eva Peron, selezione della città omonima, secondo la denominazione in vigore tra il 1952 and il 1955 per la città di La Plata.

Per la prima volta una squadra diversa dalla solite Provincia and Capital, raggiunse la finale.

Rugby Union in Argentina in 1954
 The "Championship of Buenos Aires" was won by Club Atlético San Isidro 
 The "Cordoba Province Championship" was won by the Jockey Club Córdoba.
 The "North-East Championship" was won for the first time by Cardenales
 France national rugby union team toured Argentina and Chile, playing 12 matches, all won, with two test won by 22-8 and 30-3

Knock out stages

Final 

 Provincia: R. Frigerio, E. Caffarone, A. Palma, A. Salinas, O. Bernacchi, C. Palacios, G. Ehrman (Cap.), J. Lourés, M. Sarandón, R. Grosse, O. Martínez, C. Brondstedt, C. Travaglini, V. Christianson, R. Follet.
  Eva Peron: E. Massone, E. Vergara, D. Montes, C. La Rosa, A. De Cucco, E. Brea, J. Jáuregui, M. Morón, A. Fernández, H. Carnicero, L. Gitard, C. Olivera, R. Gorostiaga (Cap.), A. Dentone, R. Giner

Bibliography 
  Memorias de la UAR 1954
  X Campeonato Argentino

Notes 

Campeonato Argentino de Rugby
Argentina
Rugby